Werneria mertensiana is a species of toad in the family Bufonidae. It is found in western Cameroon (Mount Nlonako, Mount Manengouba, Mount Kala, possibly Western High Plateau) and possibly in the Obudu Plateau in Nigeria. The specific name mertensiana honours Robert Mertens, a German zoologist and herpetologist. Common name Mertens' smalltongue toad has been coined for it.

It can also be found in leaf-litter away from water. It can be locally relatively abundant. The main threat to it is probably habitat loss.

References

mertensiana
Frogs of Africa
Amphibians of Cameroon
Amphibians of West Africa
Amphibians described in 1976
Taxonomy articles created by Polbot